Kamikatsu Zero-waste Center (also known as "WHY") is a waste management and materials recovery facility that recycles over 80 percent of the waste produced in Kamikatsu, which is much higher than the 20 percent average in the rest of Japan. It is at the center of what The Washington Post describes as an "ambitious path toward a zero-waste life".

History 

 May 20, 2020 – Opening.
 April 16, 2021 – Received the Architectural Institute of Japan Award for Best Work.
 January 24, 2021 – Received Grand Prize for the Ministry of Internal Affairs and Communications's Furusato Zukuri Awards.

Facilities 

Made predominantly using waste materials such as used windows, the facilities are in the shape of a question mark.

 Waste separation station, stock yard.
 Kuru Kuru Shop, a reuse shop.
 Learning center.
 Laundromat and restrooms.
 Collaborative laboratory.
 Hotel WHY, where guests experience the town's recycling system.

Zero-waste policy in Kamikatsu 
Kamikatsu is a "zero waste" town, all household waste is separated into 45 different categories and sent to be recycled. In 2008, a poll showed that 40 percent of residents were still unhappy about the aspect of the policy that required items to be washed. But the town continues the policy as it is cheaper and more environmentally friendly than purchasing an incinerator. The town recycles about 80 percent of its waste, compared to 20 percent in the rest of Japan, which is still relatively high compared to the USA at 9 percent and the Philippines at less than 5 percent, according to a Rappler article. The town has set a goal to become fully zero waste by 2020.

Architectural awards 

 2021 – Architectural Institute of Japan Award for Best Work
 2021 – Japan Institute of Architects Environmental Architecture Award
 2021 – Dezeen Awards, sustainable building of the year

References

External links 

 Kamikatsu Zero Waster Center
 KAMIKATSU ZERO WASTE CENTER – Hiroshi Nakamura & NAP

Waste management
Recycling in Japan
Waste treatment technology
2020 establishments in Japan
Kamikatsu, Tokushima